Gymnopilus konkinyerius is a species of mushroom in the family Hymenogastraceae.

See also

List of Gymnopilus species

External links
Gymnopilus konkinyerius at Index Fungorum

konkinyerius
Fungi of North America
Taxa named by Cheryl A. Grgurinovic